Aron Eli Coleite (sometimes credited Aron Coleite) is an American comic book writer, television writer and producer best known for his work on the Netflix series Daybreak, the NBC series Heroes and on the comic book series Ultimate X-Men.

Career

Television work 
Coleite got his start in television serving as a co-producer on the first season of Heroes from 2006-07. He continued to work on the show through to the conclusion of its fourth and final season, eventually being promoted to co-executive producer. During this time he was credited with writing ten episodes. In 2012 he served as a writer and co-executive producer on the Steven Spielberg produced mockumentary thriller series The River at ABC. He wrote two episodes, including co-writing the series finale with Zack Estrin and Michael Green.

In 2012, Coleite had a pilot called Trooper set up at TNT, which starred Mira Sorvino as an unconventional state trooper and was executive produced by Jerry Bruckheimer. However, TNT passed on the pilot in early 2013.

In June 2016, it was announced that Coleite had joined the writing staff for Star Trek: Discovery.

In July 2018, it was announced that Coleite was credited as an executive producer, showrunner, writer and co-creator of the Netflix post-apocalyptic comedy series, Daybreak. The series premiered on October 24, 2019. He also developed, executive produced and wrote for Netflix's Locke & Key.

Film work 
Coleite currently has two screenplays in development. The first, an apocalyptic drama entitled The End, is set up at Warner Bros. Studios and will be directed by Drew Barrymore. The second is an adaptation of a short story by Rick Yancey entitled When First We Were Gods, set in a world where immortality can be bought by the rich and follows a man who attempts to murder his immortal wife so that his mortal mistress can take her place and live forever.

Ultimate X-Men 
In 2008-09, Coleite served as the writer on the comic book series Ultimate X-Men, writing three story arcs: Absolute Power, Ultimatum and Ultimatum: X-Men Requiem.

References

External links 
 

American male screenwriters
American television producers
American television writers
Living people
Place of birth missing (living people)
Year of birth missing (living people)
American male television writers